Malay and Indonesian grammar is the body of rules that describe the structure of expressions in the Malay language (Brunei, Malaysia, and Singapore) and Indonesian (Indonesia and Timor Leste). This includes the structure of words, phrases, clauses and sentences. In Malay and Indonesian, there are four basic parts of speech: nouns, verbs, adjectives, and grammatical function words (particles). Nouns and verbs may be basic roots, but frequently they are derived from other words by means of prefixes and suffixes. 

For clarity, ⟨ê⟩ is used to denote schwa /ə/, while ⟨e⟩ is used to denote pure /e/, as both Malay and Indonesian in their orthography do not distinguish both phonemes and written as ⟨e⟩ (Indonesian also uses accentless ⟨e⟩ for /ə/ and ⟨é⟩ for /e/ instead as in Javanese).

Word formation
Malay is an agglutinative language, and new words are formed by three methods. New words can be created by attaching affixes onto a root word (affixation), formation of a compound word (composition), or repetition of words or portions of words (reduplication). However, the Malay morphology has been simplified significantly, resulting on extensive derivational morphology but also having minimal inflectional morphology. Because of this, Malay and Indonesian are together classified as partially isolating languages, like other languages spoken in the mainland Southeast Asia.

Affixes
Root words are either nouns or verbs, which can be affixed to derive new words, e.g., masak (to cook) yields mêmasak (cooks, as a verb), mêmasakkan (cooks for), dimasak (cooked) as well as pêmasak (a cook), masakan (a meal, cookery). Many initial consonants undergo mutation when prefixes are added: e.g., sapu (sweep) becomes pênyapu (broom); panggil (to call) becomes mêmanggil (calls/calling), tapis (to sift) becomes mênapis (sifts).

Other examples of the use of affixes to change the meaning of a word can be seen with the word ajar (teach):
 ajar = teach
  ajar-an  = teachings
  bêl-ajar  = to learn, to study (the object is not necessary)
  mêng-ajar  = to teach
  di-ajar  = being taught (intransitive)
  di-ajar-kan  = being taught (transitive)
  mêmpêl-ajar-i  = to learn, to study (the object is necessary)
  dipêl-ajar-i  = being studied
  pêl-ajar  = student
  pêng-ajar  = teacher
  pêl-ajar-an  = subject, education
  pêng-ajar-an  = lesson, moral of story
  pêmbêl-ajar-an  = learning
  têr-ajar  = taught (accidentally)
  têrpêl-ajar  = well-educated, literally "been taught"
  bêrpêl-ajar-an  = is educated, literally "has education"

There are four types of affixes, namely prefixes (awalan), suffixes (akhiran), circumfixes (apitan) and infixes (sisipan). These affixes are categorised into noun affixes, verb affixes, and adjective affixes.

Noun affixes are affixes that form nouns upon addition to root words. The following are examples of noun affixes:

The prefix pêr- drops its r before r, l and frequently before p, t, k. In some words it is peng-; though formally distinct in both phonologically and functionally, these are treated as variants of the same prefix in Malay grammar books.

Similarly, verb affixes are attached to root words to form verbs. In Malay, there are:

Adjective affixes are attached to root words to form adjectives:

In addition to these affixes, Malay also has a lot of borrowed affixes from other languages such as Sanskrit, Arabic and English. For example, maha-, pasca-, eka-, bi-, anti-, pro- etc.

Reduplication
Reduplication (kata ganda or kata ulang) in the Malay language is a very productive process. It is mainly used for forming plurals, but sometimes it may alter the meaning of the whole word, or change the usage of the word in sentences.

Forms
There are four types of words reduplication in Malay, namely
 Full reduplication (kata ganda penuh (Malaysian) or kata ulang utuh (Indonesian) or dwilingga)
 Partial reduplication (kata ganda separa (Malaysian) or kata ulang sebagian (Indonesian) or dwipurwa)
 Rhythmic reduplication (kata ganda berentak (Malaysian) or kata ulang salin suara (Indonesian))
 Reduplication of meaning

Full reduplication is the complete duplication of the word, separated by a dash (-). For example, buku (book) when duplicated form buku-buku (books), while the duplicated form of batu (stone) is batu-batu (stones).

Partial reduplication repeats only the initial consonant of the word, such as dêdaun (leaves) from the word daun (leaf), and têtangga (neighbor) from the word tangga (ladder). The words are usually not separated by spaces or punctuation, and each is considered a single word.

Rhythmic reduplication repeats the whole word, but one or more of its phonemes are altered. For example, the word gêrak (motion) can be reduplicated rhythmically to form gêrak-gêrik (movements) by altering the vowel. The reduplication can also be formed by altering the consonant, e.g., in sayur-mayur (vegetables [bundled for the market]) from the root word sayur (vegetable/vegetables [what is found on plate]).

Nouns
Common derivational affixes for nouns are pêng-/pêr-/juru- (actor, instrument, or someone characterized by the root), -an (collectivity, similarity, object, place, instrument), kê-...-an (abstractions and qualities, collectivities), pêr-/pêng-...-an (abstraction, place, goal or result).

Gender
Malay does not make use of grammatical gender. There are only a few words that use natural gender; the same word used for he and she is also used for his and her. Most of the words that refer to people (family terms, professions, etc.) have a form that does not distinguish between the sexes.  For example, adik can refer to a younger sibling of either sex. To specify the natural gender of a noun, an adjective must be added: adik lêlaki corresponds to "brother" but really means "male younger sibling".  There are some words that are gendered. For instance, putêri means "princess" and putêra means "prince"; words like these are usually borrowed from other languages (in this case, Sanskrit).

Number
There is no grammatical plural in Malay. Thus orang may mean either "person" or "people". Plurality is expressed by the context, or the usage of words such as numerals, bêbêrapa "some", or sêmua "all" that express plurality. In many cases, it simply isn't relevant to the speaker. Because of this, both Malay and Indonesian effectively has general number, similar to many languages of East Asia and Southeast Asia.

Reduplication is commonly used to emphasize plurality. However, reduplication has many other functions. For example, orang-orang means "(all the) people", but orang-orangan means "scarecrow". Similarly, while hati means "heart" or "liver", hati-hati is a verb meaning "to be careful". Also, not all reduplicated words are inherently plural, such as orang-orangan "scarecrow/scarecrows", biri-biri "a/some sheep" and kupu-kupu "butterfly/butterflies". Some reduplication is rhyming rather than exact, as in sayur-mayur "(all sorts of) vegetables".

Distributive affixes derive mass nouns that are effectively plural: pohon "tree", pêpohonan "flora, trees"; rumah "house", pêrumahan "housing, houses"; gunung "mountain", pê(r)gunungan "mountain range, mountains".

Quantity words come before the noun: sêribu orang "a thousand people", bêbêrapa pê(r)gunungan "a series of mountain ranges", bêbêrapa kupu-kupu "some butterflies".

Pronouns
Personal pronouns are not a separate part of speech, but a subset of nouns. They are frequently omitted, and there are numerous ways to say "you". Commonly the person's name, title, title with name, or occupation is used ("does Johnny want to go?", "would Madam like to go?"); kin terms, including fictive kinship, are extremely common. However, there are also dedicated personal pronouns, as well as the demonstrative pronouns ini "this, the" and itu "that, the".

Personal pronouns

From the perspective of a European language, Malay boasts a wide range of different pronouns, especially to refer to the addressee (the so-called second person pronouns). These are used to differentiate several parameters of the person they are referred to, such as the social rank and the relationship between the addressee and the speaker.

This table shows an overview over the most commonly and widely used pronouns of the Malay language:

First person pronouns

Notable among the personal-pronoun system is a distinction between two forms of "we": kita (you and me, you and us) and kami (us, but not you). The distinction is increasingly confused in colloquial Indonesian, but not in Malaysian.

Saya and aku are the two major forms of "I"; saya (or its literary / archaic form sahaya) is the more formal form, whereas aku is used with close acquaintances like family and friends, and between lovers. Sa(ha)ya may also be used for "we", but in such cases it is usually used with sêkalian or sêmua "all"; this form is ambiguous as to whether it corresponds with exclusive kami or inclusive kita. Less common are hamba "slave", hamba tuan, hamba datok (all extremely humble), beta (a royal addressing oneselves), patik (a commoner addressing a royal), kami (royal or editorial "we"), kita, têman, and kawan (lit. "friend").

Second person pronouns

There are three common forms of "you", anda (polite), kamu (familiar), and kalian "y'all" (commonly used as a plural form of you, slightly informal). Anda is used in formal contexts like in advertisements and business or to show respect (though terms like tuan "sir" and other titles also work the same way), while kamu is used in informal situations. Anda sêkalian or Anda semua are polite plural. Engkau orang —contracted to kau orang or korang—is used to address subjects plural in the most informal context.

Êngkau (commonly shortened to kau) and hang (dialectical) are used to social inferiors or equals, awak to equals, and êncik (contracted to cik before a name) is polite, traditionally used for people without title. The compounds makcik and pakcik are used with village elders one is well acquainted with or the guest of.

Tuanku (from tuan aku, "my lord") is used by commoners to address royal members.

Third person pronouns
The common word for "s/he" is ia, which has the object and emphatic/focused form dia; consequently ia has been recently used to refer to animals. Bêliau ("his/her Honour") is respectful. As with the English "you", names and kin terms are extremely common. Colloquially, dia orang (or its contracted form diorang) is commonly used for the plural "they" whereas mereka "they", mereka itu, or orang itu "those people" are used in writing.

Baginda – corresponding to "his/her Majesty/Highness" – is used for addressing royal figures and religious prophets, especially in Islamic literature.

Regional varieties

There are a large number of other words for "I" and "you", many regional, dialectical, or borrowed from local languages. Saudara (masc., "you") or saudari (fem., pl. saudara-saudara / saudari-saudari / saudara-saudari) show utmost respect. Daku ("I") and dikau ("you") are poetic or romantic. Indonesian gua ("I") and lu "you" are slangs and extremely informal. In the dialect of the northern states of Malaysia – Kedah, Penang, Perlis and Perak (northern) typically hang is used as "you" (singular), while hampa or hangpa are used for the plural "you". In the state of Pahang, two variants for "I" and "you" exist, depending on location: in East Pahang, around Pekan, kome is used as "I" while in the west around Temerloh, koi, keh or kah is used. Kome is also used in Kuala Kangsar, Perak, but instead it means "you". This allegedly originated from the fact that both the royal families of Pahang and Perak (whose seats are in Pekan and Kuala Kangsar respectively) were descendants of the same ancient line.

The informal pronouns aku, kamu, engkau, ia, kami, and kita are indigenous to Malay.

Possessive pronouns
Aku, kamu, êngkau, and ia have short possessive enclitic forms. All others retain their full forms like other nouns, as does emphatic dia: meja saya, meja kita, meja anda, meja dia "my table, our table, your table, his/her table".

There are also proclitic forms of aku and êngkau, ku- and kau-. These are used when there is no emphasis on the pronoun:

Ku-dengar raja itu pênyakit sopak. Aku tahu ilmu tabib. Aku-lah mêngubati dia.
"It has come to my attention that the Raja has a skin disease. I am skilled in medicine. I will cure him."
Here ku-verb is used for a general report, aku verb is used for a factual statement, and emphatic aku-lah mêng-verb (≈ "I am the one who...") for focus on the pronoun.

Demonstrative pronouns
There are two demonstrative pronouns in Malay. Ini "this, these" is used for a noun generally near to the speaker. Itu "that, those" is used for a noun generally far from the speaker. Either may sometimes be equivalent to English "the". There is no difference between singular and plural. However, plural can be indicated through duplication of a noun followed by a ini or itu. The word yang "which" is often placed before demonstrative pronouns to give emphasis and a sense of certainty, particularly when making references or enquiries about something/someone, like English "this one" or "that one".

Measure words
Another distinguishing feature of Malay is its use of measure words, also called classifiers (penjodoh bilangan). In this way, it is similar to many other languages of Asia, including Chinese, Japanese, Vietnamese, Thai, Burmese, and Bengali.

Measure words are found in English, such as two grains of sand or a loaf of bread where *two sands and *a bread would be ungrammatical. The word satu reduces to sê-, as it does in other compounds:

Less common are

Measure words are not necessary just to say "a": burung "a bird, birds". Using sê- plus a measure word is closer to English "one" or "a certain":
Ada sêekor burung yang pandai bêrcakap
"There was a (certain) bird that could talk"

Verbs
Verbs are not inflected for person or number, and they are not marked for tense; tense is instead denoted by time adverbs (such as "yesterday") or by other tense indicators, such as sudah "already" and belum "not yet". On the other hand, there is a complex system of verb affixes to render nuances of meaning and to denote voice or intentional and accidental moods, and it has many exceptions for its conjugation. Some of these affixes are ignored in colloquial speech.

Examples of these include the prefixes:
 mêng- (agent focus, frequently but erroneously called "active voice", for AVO word order);
 di- (patient focus, frequently but erroneously called "passive voice", for OVA word order);
 pêr- (causative,  also notice that when mixed with mêng- prefix forms mêmper- instead of mêmêr-, latter informally);
 bêr- (stative or habitual; intransitive VS order); and 
 têr- (involitive actions, such as those that are involuntary, sudden, or accidental, for VA = VO order). 
The suffixes include: 
-kan (causative or benefactive); and
 -i (locative, repetitive, or exhaustive). 
The circumfixes include:
 bêr-...-an (plural subject, diffuse action); and 
 kê-...-an (unintentional or potential action or state).

The prefix mêng- (and pêng-) changes depending to the first letter of the root. The prefix mêngê- is used before monosyllabic roots, although some roots like  "to know" seems to have mêngê- on the form mêngêtahui instead non-existent actor focus *mênahu (but tahu-mênahu), are actually. 

The prefixes bêr- and têr- change to bê- and tê- when preceding initial r-, or preceding the first syllable which contains -êr- (ber- -an + pergi "to go" → bepergian). The prefixes ber- and pêr- (but not ter-) preserves an irregular -l- when prefixed to the word  "to teach".

Here is the example of conjugated forms of duduk:
 duduk "to sit down"
 mêndudukkan "to sit someone down, give someone a seat, to appoint"
 mênduduki "to sit on, to occupy"
 didudukkan "to be given a seat, to be appointed"
 diduduki "to be sat on, to be occupied"
 têrduduk "to sink down, to come to sit"
 kêdudukan "to be situated", "position"
 bêrsekedudukan "to cohabit"
 bêrkedudukan "to have position"
 pênduduk "resident"

Often the derivation changes the meaning of the verb rather substantially:
 tinggal to reside, to live (in a place)
 mêninggal to die, to pass away (short form of meninggal dunia, "to pass on from the world")
 mêninggalkan "to leave (a place)", "to leave behind/abandon" (someone/something)
 ditinggalkan "to be left behind, to be abandoned"
 têrtinggal "to be left behind"
 kêtinggalan "to miss (a bus, train)" (and thus "to be left behind")
 pêninggalan "heritage"

Forms in têr- and kê-...-an are often equivalent to adjectives in English. In some verbs which derives from adjectives, like mêmanjang "to lengthen"; when affixed with ter- (têrpanjang "longest") coincides with the superlative prefix ter-, effectively has the meaning "longest" instead of "(accidentally) lengthened", the meaning is served by reaffixed forms like têrpanjangi or têrpanjangkan.

Negation 
Four words are used for negation in Malay, namely tidak, bukan, jangan, and belum.

 Tidak (not), colloquially shortened to tak, is used for the negation of verbs and "adjectives".
 Bukan (be-not) is used in the negation of a noun.
For example:

 Jangan (do not!) is used for negating imperatives or advising against certain actions. For example,
Jangan tinggalkan saya di sini!
Don't leave me here!

 Bêlum is used with the sense that something has not yet been accomplished or experienced. In this sense, bêlum can be used as a negative response to a question.
Anda sudah pêrnah ke Indonesia, or Anda sudah pêrnah ke Indonesia bêlum?
Have you ever been to Indonesia before, (or not)?

Bêlum, saya masih bêlum pernah pergi ke IndonesiaNo, I have not yet been to IndonesiaOrang itu bêlum têrbiasa tinggal di IndonesiaThat person is not (yet) used to living in Indonesia.

 Function words 
16 types of function words in Malay perform a grammatical function in a sentence. Amongst these are conjunctions, interjections, prepositions, negations and determiners.

 Adjectives 
There are grammatical adjectives in Malay. Stative verbs are often used for the purpose as well. Adjectives are always placed after the noun that they modify. Hence, "rumah saya" means "my house", while "saya rumah" means "I am a house".

To form superlatives, the prefix têr- is used, although alternatively there are some adverbs forming periphrastic superlatives like paling "the most".

 Word order 
Stative verbs, demonstrative determiners, and possessive determiners follow the noun they modify.

Malay does not have a grammatical subject in the sense that English does (traditional grammars, however, have a concept of grammatical subjects). In intransitive clauses, the noun comes before the verb. When there is both an agent and an object, these are separated by the verb (OVA or AVO), with the difference encoded in the voice of the verb. OVA, commonly but inaccurately called "passive", is the basic and most common word order.

Either the agent or object or both may be omitted. This is commonly done to accomplish one of two things:

1) Adding a sense of politeness and respect to a statement or question

For example, a polite shop assistant in a store may avoid the use of pronouns altogether and ask:

2) Agent or object is unknown, not important, or understood from context

For example, a friend may enquire as to when you bought your property, to which you may respond:

Ultimately, the choice of voice and therefore word order is a choice between actor and patient and depends quite heavily on the language style and context.

 Emphasis 
Word order is frequently modified for focus or emphasis, with the focused word usually placed at the beginning of the clause and followed by a slight pause (a break in intonation):

 Saya pêrgi kê pasar kê(l)marin  "I went to the market yesterday" – neutral, or with focus on the subject.
 Kê(l)marin saya pergi kê pasar "Yesterday I went to the market" – emphasis on yesterday.
 Kê pasar saya pergi, kê(l)marin "To the market I went yesterday" – emphasis on where I went yesterday.
 Pêrgi ke pasar, saya, kê(l)marin'' "To the market went I yesterday" – emphasis on the process of going to the market.

The last two occur more often in speech than writing.

References

Bibliography

 
 
 
 

 
Austronesian grammars